This is a list of words that have entered the English language from the Yiddish language, many of them by way of American English.
 
Many of these words are more common in the American entertainment industry (initially via vaudeville), the Catskills/Borscht Belt, and New York City English. A number of Yiddish words also entered English via large Jewish communities in Britain, particularly London, where Yiddish has influenced Cockney English.

Background
Yiddish is a Germanic language, originally spoken by Jews in Central and later Eastern Europe, written in the Hebrew alphabet, and containing a substantial substratum of Hebrew words as well as numerous loans from Slavic languages. For that reason, some of the words listed originated in Hebrew or Slavic languages, but have entered English via Yiddish.

Yiddish is closely related to modern German, and many Yiddish words have German cognates; in some cases it is difficult to tell whether a particular word was borrowed from Yiddish or from German.

Many of these words have slightly different meanings and usage in English from the Yiddish originals. For example, chutzpah usually has a negative connotation in Yiddish, meaning improper audacity, while in English it is more positive. In Yiddish,  is usually a transitive verb for carrying (or dragging) something else, while the English word, schlep, is also used as an intransitive verb, for dragging oneself, and as a noun for an insignificant person or hanger-on. In Yiddish,  means 'slip', while in English, glitch means malfunction.

List of words

These English words of Yiddish origin, except as noted, are in the online editions of the Oxford English Dictionary (OED), The American Heritage Dictionary of the English Language (AHD), or the Merriam-Webster dictionary (MW). The parentheses-enclosed information at the end of each word's entry starts with the original Yiddish term in Hebrew script, the Latin script transliteration, and the literal English translation (if different from the English definition given earlier). This may be followed by additional relevant languages (mostly Hebrew and German). One or more dictionary references appear at the end.

B 
Bris: The circumcision of a male child.
Boychik: Boy, young man. (English boy + Eastern Yiddish: , diminutive suffix (from Slavic); AHD)
Bupkis (also Bupkes, Bupkus, Bubkis, Bubkes): Emphatically nothing, as in 'He isn't worth bupkis' (of uncertain origin (OED); perhaps originally meaning '[goat] droppings', from a word meaning 'beans', of Slavic origin) (MW, OED)

C 
Chutzpah : Nerve, gall, guts, balls, daring, self-confidence, audacity, effrontery (from Hebrew; AHD)

D 
Daven: To recite Jewish liturgical prayers (AHD)
Dreck: Worthless, distasteful, or nonsensical material (from Middle High ;; AHD)
Dybbuk: The malevolent spirit of a dead person that enters and controls a living body until exorcised (AHD)

F 

G 
Ganef or Gonif: A thief, scoundrel, rascal (AHD)
Gelt : Money in general; also the chocolate coins given to children on Hanukkah (related to 'gold'; AHD)
Golem: A man-made humanoid; an android, Frankenstein monster (OED, MW)

H 
Haimish (also Heimish) : Home-like, friendly, folksy (AHD).

K 
Kibitz : To offer unwanted advice, e.g. to someone playing cards; to converse idly, hence a kibitzer, gossip (cf. German: , may be related to German: ; OED, MW)
Klutz: A clumsy person (OED, MW)
Kvell: To express great pleasure combined with pride (from an old Germanic word;; OED, MW)
Kvetch : to complain habitually, gripe; as a noun, a person who always complains (OED, MW) There is also a connection to the Hebrew and Aramaic radix "k.w.z", meaning "squeeze".

L 
Litvak: A Lithuanian Jew (OED)
Lox: Cured salmon, sometimes referred to as Nova, often used loosely to refer to smoked salmon (OED, MW)

M 
Mamzer: Bastard (OED)
Maven: Expert, aficionado (OED, MW)
Mazel tov, also Mazal tov: Congratulations! (from Hebrew :  or 'luck' + ; OED, MW:Hebrew)
Usually used in American English as "the whole Megillah" meaning an overly extended explanation or story.
Mensch: An upright person; a decent human being (OED, MW)
Meshuga, also Meshugge, Meshugah, Meshuggah : Crazy (OED, MW). Also used as the nouns meshuggener and meshuggeneh for a crazy man and woman, respectively.
Meshugaas, also Mishegaas or Mishegoss : Crazy or senseless activity or behavior; craziness (from Hebrew: , a form of the above; OED, AHD)
Minyan: The quorum of ten adult (i.e., age 13 or older) Jews that is necessary for the holding of a public worship service; in Orthodox Judaism ten adult males are required, while in Conservative and Reform Judaism ten adults of either sex are required. (OED)
Mishpocha : relative or extended family member (OED)

N 
Naches : The feeling of pride and/or gratification in 1: the achievements of another; 2. one's own doing good by helping someone or some organization (OED)
Narrischkeit : Foolishness, nonsense (from  + ;; OED) 
Nebbish, also Nebbich: An insignificant, pitiful person; a nonentity (from interjection , perhaps from Czech nebohý or other Slavic source; OED, MW)
Noodge, also Nudzh: To pester, nag, whine; as a noun, a pest, whiner, or anxious person (from Polish nudzić 'to bore' or Russian nudit' 'to wear out'; OED)
Nosh: Snack (noun or verb) (OED, MW)
Nu: A multipurpose interjection analogous to "well?", "so?", or "so what?" (perhaps akin to Russian: ; OED)
Nudnik: A pest, "pain in the neck"; a bore (from the above ;; OED, MW)

O 

Oy or Oy vey: An interjection of grief, pain, or horror ( or 'oh, woe!';; OED)

P 
Pareve : Containing neither meat nor dairy products (OED, MW)
German:  or dialectal German: ; OED)
Potch also Petch: Spank, slap, smack (OED)
Plotz: To burst from strong emotion; often used humorously to express minor shock or disappointment (OED)
Putz: (vulgar) A penis, term used as an insult (AHD).  Also an insignificant person, incompetent, or loser.  As a verb, to idle, bodge, goof off.

S 
Schav: A chilled soup made of sorrel. (AHD) 
Schlep: To drag or haul (an object); to walk, esp. to make a tedious journey (OED, MW).  Also a noun, a lackie, hanger-on, or loser.
Schlimazel also Schlemazl: A chronically unlucky person (from [Middle Dutch:  or Middle High German:  or ] + Hebrew:;; OED). The difference between a schlemiel and a schlimazel is described through the aphorism, "The schlemiel spills his soup on the schlimazel."
Schlong: (vulgar) A penis (OED)
Schlub: A clumsy, stupid, or unattractive person (OED, MW)
Schmaltz: Melted chicken fat; excessive sentimentality (OED, MW)
Schmatte: A rag (OED)
Schmeer also schmear: from Polish 'smarowac' to smear, to spread, coll. to bribe; (noun or verb) Spread (e.g., cream cheese on a bagel); bribe (OED, MW)
Schmo: A stupid person (akin to schmuck according to AHD, but disputed by OED)
Schmooze: To converse informally, make small talk or chat (OED, MW).  To persuade in insincere or oily fashion; to "lay it on thick".  Noun: schmoozer, abbr. schmooze.
Schmuck: (vulgar) A contemptible or foolish person; a jerk; (probably from Old Polish ; MW, EO)
Schmutter: Pieces of clothing; rubbish (cf. schmatte; OED)
Schmutz : Dirt (OED)
Schnorrer: beggar, esp. "one who wheedles others into supplying his wants" (OED, MW)
Shabbos, Shabbas, Shabbes: Shabbat (AHD)
Shammes or Shamash : The caretaker of a synagogue; also, the ninth candle of the Hanukkah menorah, used to light the others (OED, MW)
Shamus: a detective (possibly  or the Irish name Seamus; OED, Macquarie)
Shemozzle: (slang) Quarrel, brawl (perhaps related to schlimazel, q.v.; OED). This word is commonly used in Ireland to describe confused situations during the Irish sport of hurling, e.g. 'There was a shemozzle near the goalmouth'. In particular, it was a catchphrase of 1940s-1980s television commentator Michael O'Hehir.
Shikker, Shicker, Shickered: Drunk (adjective or noun) (OED)
Shiksa or Shikse : (often derogatory) A young non-Jewish woman (a derivative of sheygets,; AHD)
Shmendrik or Shmendrick: A foolish or contemptible person (from a character in an operetta by Abraham Goldfaden; OED)
Shtibl: A small synagogue or place of prayer (OED)
Shtick: Comic theme; a defining habit or distinguishing feature or business (AHD)
Shtum: Quiet, silent; OED)
Shtup: (vulgar slang) To have sexual intercourse (OED)
Shul: a synagogue (from Middle High German: ;; MW)
Shvitz: to sweat (v.), a sauna or steam bath (n.) (OED)
Spiel or Shpiel: A sales pitch or speech intended to persuade (AHD)

T 
Tchotchke: A knickknack, trinket, curio (OED, MW)
Tref or Trayf or Traif : Not kosher (AHD)
Tsuris : Troubles, grief (AHD)
Tuchus (also Tuches, Tuchis, Tukus, or Tukhus) : The buttocks, bottom, rear end (OED)
German:  or 'cavort'; OED, MW)
Tush (also Tushy): The buttocks, bottom, rear end (cf. tuchus; OED, MW)

Tzimmes: A sweet stew of vegetables and fruit; a fuss, a confused affair, a to-do (OED, MW)

V 
Vigorish (also contraction Vig): That portion of the gambling winnings held by the bookmaker as payment for services (OED)
Verklempt: Choked with emotion (originally 'pressed, gripped'; cf. German: verklemmt meaning 'uptight' MW)

Y 

Yekke: (mildly derogatory) A German Jew; Its most common usage derives from the British Mandate period to describe Fifth Aliyah German Jews, who were perceived to be more formal in dress and manners. (OED)
Yenta: A talkative woman; a gossip; a scold (from a given name; OED, MW) Yentl, such a girl.
Yiddish: The Yiddish language (AHD)
Yontef also Yom Tov: A Jewish holiday on which work is forbidden, e.g. Rosh Hashanah, Yom Kippur, Pesach (OED)
Yutz: A fool (perhaps derived from putz; NPD, AHD)

Z 
Zaftig, also Zaftik : Pleasingly plump, buxom, full-figured, as a woman (OED, MW)

See also
List of English words of Hebrew origin
List of German expressions in English
Lists of English words by country or language of origin
Yeshivish
Yiddish words used in English
Yinglish
Shm-reduplication, an English-language reduplication of Yiddish origin

Notes

External links
"How to Speak Recording Studio Yiddish", Henry Engineering
"Some Yiddish Words", John J. Parsons, Hebrew for Christians

Judeo-English languages
Yiddish
List of words
 
Lists of loanwords of Germanic origin